Sir Gilbert Heathcote, 1st Baronet (2 January 1652 – 25 January 1733), was a British merchant and Whig politician who sat in the English and British House of Commons between 1701 and 1733. He was a Governor of the Bank of England and was Lord Mayor of London in 1711.

Early life
Heathcote was the eldest son of Gilbert Heathcote of Chesterfield, Derbyshire, and his wife, Anne Dickons, daughter of George Dickons of Chesterfield. He began his apprenticeship as a merchant overseas, and returned to England in 1680 to set himself up as a City trader. He became a Freeman of the Vintners' Company in 1681. On 30 May 1682, he married Hester Rayner, daughter of Christopher Rayner, merchant, of London. He was living in the parish of St Dunstan's-in-the-East in 1682 and established a business as a merchant in St Swithin's Lane trading in Spanish wines and other produce. He took his first step in Corporation government when elected Common Councilman for Walbrook ward in 1689. In 1690, he succeeded his father.

Heathcote was an agent for Jamaica from 1693 to 1704, furnishing remittances on behalf of the government for the troops there. He also traded extensively with the East Indies. 

In 1693, the ship Redbridge, of which he was part owner, was detained by the East India Company, which claimed a monopoly of the trade with India. He asserted at the bar of the House of Commons his right to trade wherever he pleased, unless restrained by Parliament, and the house declared by resolution against the company's monopoly. Heathcote promoted the bill for a new East India Company. In 1694 he was a Commissioner taking subscriptions to the Bank of England and selected by ballot as a director of the bank from then, with statutory intervals for the rest of his life. He was a commissioner for Greenwich Hospital in 1695. In 1697 he was a trustee for Exchequer bills and became treasurer of the Eastland Company until 1699. 

At a meeting of this company, held in London about 1698, Peter the Great was present, and was addressed by Heathcote 'in high Dutch' with reference to the importation of tobacco into his dominions. In 1698, he was a Commissioner for taking subscriptions to the New East India Company loan subscribing 10,000l. of its capital himself. He was a member of a committee of seven to arrange matters with the old company and became a Director of the new Company until 1704.

Political career

At the 1698 English general election Heathcote stood for Parliament for the City of London, but was defeated. He became a member of the Russia Company in 1699. In 1700, he was master of the Vintners' Company. He was returned as Member of Parliament for City of London at the first general election of 1701 but was expelled on 20 March 1701 for his share in the circulation of some exchequer bills. He was however returned at the second general election of 1701.

Heathcote became an alderman for Walbrook on 30 June 1702, and was returned again as MP for London at the 1702 English general election. He was knighted by the Queen on 29 October 1702, when she was dining at banquet at the Guildhall. He was also a manager of the united trade of the English company trading with the East Indies from 1702 to 1704. 

He was elected Sheriff of London on midsummer-day 1703, having been fined in 1698 for declining the office, and served for the year 1703 to 1704. In 1705, he was elected a Fellow of the Royal Society. He was a manager of the united trade again from 1705 to 1709. At the 1705 English general election he was returned again as MP for the City of London. He was a trustee for receiving the loan to the Emperor in 1706. From 1707 to 1710, he was a Colonel of the Blue Regiment of the city Militia, and was treasurer of the Honourable Artillery Company (HAC) from 1708 to 1711. At the 1708 British general election he was returned again as MP for the City of London. He was governor of the Bank of England from 1709 to 1711. 

By an act of parliament extending the Bank's charter to 1710, Heathcote's gain was said to be 60,000l. At the 1710 general election he lost his parliamentary seat for the City of London.

In 1710, when Heathcote was next in seniority for election as Lord Mayor of London, he was strongly opposed by the court party, who objected to the remonstrance he addressed to the queen, but the court of aldermen finally elected him and he served from 1710 to 1711. He was unpopular and for this reason his Lord Mayor's procession to Westminster on 30 October was cut short, and the livery companies attended him by water in their barges. 

He was the last Lord Mayor to ride on horseback in the Mayoral procession. 

He was vice-president of the HAC from 1711 to 1720 and resumed his command of the Blue Regiment in 1714 remaining as colonel for the rest of his life.

At the 1715 British general election Heathcote was returned as MP for Helston. He was appointed Commissioner for fifty new churches in 1715, remaining until 1727. 

By 1719, he was Governor of the Eastland Company. He was president of the HAC from 1720 for the rest of his life. At the 1722 British general election, he was returned as MP for New Lymington. He became president of St Thomas' Hospital in 1722 for the rest of his life. 

In 1725, he changed wards and became Alderman for Bridge Without ward, for the rest of his life. At the 1727 British general election he was returned as MP for St Germans. He purchased Normanton Hall, Rutland, in 1729 from Sir Thomas Mackworth, 4th Baronet. He was appointed a commissioner for the colony of Georgia in October 1732, and obtained much support for the proposal from his fellow-directors of the Bank of England. He was created a baronet in 1733, eight days before his death.

Although extremely rich, Heathcote's meanness is referred to by Pope; and it was this trait that accounts largely for his unpopularity with the populace. He died in London on 25 January 1733 and was buried at St Matthew's Church, Normanton, Rutland. A monument by the Flemish sculptor Rysbrack is now in St Mary's Church, Edith Weston. Caleb Heathcote was his brother.

Links to slavery
Gilbert Heathcote’s great wealth was generated as a merchant of slaves and, in particular, as part of the very profitable business of re‑exporting slaves to the Spanish colonies. His legacy and his family's place in the aristocracy can be said to have been obtained from the proceeds of slavery, although he did not directly own land or slaves on Jamaica.

Recognising this, the Gilbert Heathcote School in Chesterfield changed its name in 2021 to Whittington Moor Nursery and Infant Academy.

Descendants
A descendant, Sir Gilbert John Heathcote, 5th Baronet (1795–1867), was created Baron Aveland in 1856; and his son Gilbert Henry, who in 1888 inherited from his mother the barony of Willoughby de Eresby, became 1st Earl of Ancaster in 1892.

See also
Heathcote (surname)

References

1652 births
1733 deaths
People from Chesterfield, Derbyshire
Sheriffs of the City of London
18th-century lord mayors of London
Baronets in the Baronetage of Great Britain
British MPs 1707–1708
British MPs 1708–1710
British MPs 1715–1722
British MPs 1722–1727
British MPs 1727–1734
Gilbert
Members of the Parliament of England for the City of London
Members of the Parliament of Great Britain for constituencies in Cornwall
Members of the Parliament of Great Britain for English constituencies
Governors of the Bank of England
Whig (British political party) MPs
Fellows of the Royal Society
Knights Bachelor
English MPs 1701
English MPs 1701–1702
English MPs 1702–1705
English MPs 1705–1707